Maria Della Costa (born Gentile Maria Marchioro Polloni, 1 January 1926 – 24 January 2015) was a Brazilian theater, movie and TV actress and producer.

Life
She was born in Flores da Cunha, a small town of the state of Rio Grande do Sul, into a family of Italian immigrants from the region of Veneto. She was immortalized in paintings by Emiliano Di Cavalcanti, Flavio de Carvalho, Guanabarino and Djanira, and in a statue by Victor Brecheret. She started her career at 14 years of age, as a fashion model (she is considered the first professional model in Brazil).

She was married to Sandro Polloni, a theater producer, also of Italian origin. Together they founded Teatro Maria Della Costa in São Paulo in a building designed by Oscar Niemeyer and Lúcio Costa.

After retiring from show business, she owned and managed a small hotel (Coxixo Hotel) in the historical and tourist town of Paraty, Rio de Janeiro. She died of a pulmonary edema on January 24, 2015.

Filmography

Television 

 1990 - Brasileiras e Brasileiros
 1982 - Sétimo Sentido .... Juliana
 1978 - Te contei? .... Ana Paula
 1976 - Estúpido Cupido .... Olga
 1970 - As Bruxas .... Teresa
 1969 - Beto Rockfeller .... Maitê

Theatre 
 1992 - Típico Romântico
 1988 - Temos Que Refazer a Casa
 1986 - Alice, Que Delícia
 1982 - Motel Paradiso
 1974 - Tome Conta de Amélia
 1973 - Bodas de Sangue
 1968 - Tudo no Jardim
 1968 - Abra a Janela e Deixa Entrar o Ar Puro e o Sol da Manhã
 1967 - Homens de Papel
 1964 - Depois da Queda
 1963 - Pindura Saia
 1962 - Armadilha Para um Homem Só
 1962 - O Marido Vai à Caça
 1960 - Society em Baby Doll
 1959 - Gimba
 1958 - A Alma Boa de Set-Suan
 1956 - Moral em Concordata
 1956 - A Rosa Tatuada
 1956 - A Casa de Bernarda Alba
 1955 - A Mirandolina
 1955 - Com a Pulga Atrás da Orelha
 1954 - O Canto da Cotovia
 1952 - Manequim
 1951 - Ralé

References

External links

 Biography and photos. Hotel Coxixo. In Portuguese.

Della Costa, Maria
Della Costa
Della Costa
Della Costa
Della Costa
People from Paraty